Jamaica Inn is a free house in Cornwall, England. 

Jamaica Inn may also refer to:
Jamaica Inn (novel), a novel by Daphne du Maurier
Jamaica Inn (film), a 1939 film by Alfred Hitchcock
Jamaica Inn (1983 TV series), a British television series 
Jamaica Inn (2014 TV series), a British television series 
"Jamaica Inn", a song by Tori Amos from The Beekeeper
Jamaica Inn, a UK radio programme